The 2023 NASCAR Pinty's Series will be the seventeenth season of the Pinty's Series, the national stock car racing series in Canada sanctioned by NASCAR. The season will begin with the race at Sunset Speedway on May 13 and conclude with the race at Delaware Speedway on September 24.

Marc-Antoine Camirand enters the season as the defending series champion.

Teams and drivers

Complete Schedule

Limited Schedule

Schedule
On 17 January 2023, NASCAR announced the 2023 schedule. It will be the first season in history to run 14 races. It includes an additional race at Ohsweken Speedway.

See also
 2023 NASCAR Cup Series
 2023 NASCAR Xfinity Series
 2023 NASCAR Craftsman Truck Series
 2023 ARCA Menards Series
 2023 ARCA Menards Series East
 2023 ARCA Menards Series West
 2023 NASCAR Whelen Euro Series
 2023 SRX Series

References

External links
 
 Pinty's Series Standings and Statistics for 2023

Pinty's Series
NASCAR Pinty's Series
NASCAR Pinty's Series